Compsobuthus is a genus of buthid scorpions.

Species
Compsobuthus contains many species, including:

Compsobuthus abyssinicus (Birula, 1903)
Compsobuthus acutecarinatus (Simon, 1882)
Compsobuthus afghanus Kovarik & Ahmed, 2007
Compsobuthus andresi Lourenço, 2004
Compsobuthus arabicus Levy, Amitai & Shulov, 1973
Compsobuthus becvari Kovarik, 2003
Compsobuthus berlandi Vachon, 1950
Compsobuthus birulai Lourenço, Leguin & Duhem, 2010
Compsobuthus brevimanus (Werner, 1936)
Compsobuthus carmelitis Levy, Amitai & Shulov, 1973
Compsobuthus egyptiensis Lourenço, Sun & Zhu, 2009
Compsobuthus fuscatus Hendrixson, 2006
Compsobuthus garyi Lourenço & Vachon, 2001
Compsobuthus humaae Amir, Kamaluddin & Kahn, 2005
Compsobuthus jakesi Kovarik, 2003
Compsobuthus jordanensis Levy, Amitai & Shulov, 1973
Compsobuthus kabateki Kovarik, 2003
Compsobuthus kafkai Kovarik, 2003
Compsobuthus kaftani Kovarik, 2003
Compsobuthus klaptoczi (Birula, 1909)
Compsobuthus longipalpis Levy, Amitai & Shulov, 1973
Compsobuthus maindroni (Kraepelin, 1900)
Compsobuthus manzonii (Borelli, 1915)
Compsobuthus matthiesseni (Birula, 1905)
Compsobuthus nematodactylus Lowe, 2009
Compsobuthus pallidus Hendrixson, 2006
Compsobuthus persicus Navidpour, Soleglad, Fet & Kovarik, 2008
Compsobuthus petriolii Vignoli, 2005
Compsobuthus polisi Lowe, 2001
Compsobuthus plutenkoi Kovarik, 2003
Compsobuthus rugosulus (Pocock, 1900)
Compsobuthus schmiedeknechti Vachon, 1949
Compsobuthus seicherti Kovarik, 2003
Compsobuthus setosus Hendrixson, 2006
Compsobuthus simoni Lourenço, 1999
Compsobuthus sindicus Kovarik & Ahmed, 2011
Compsobuthus sobotniki Kovarik, 2004
Compsobuthus tassili Lourenço, 2010
Compsobuthus tofti Lourenço 2001
Compsobuthus tombouctou Lourenço, 2009
Compsobuthus vachoni Sisson, 1994
Compsobuthus werneri (Birula, 1908)
Compsobuthus williamsi Lourenço, 1999

References

Buthidae
Scorpion genera